

Events 
February 23 – Première of Pierre Beaumarchais's play, The Barber of Seville, which will later provide material for more than one opera.
Wilhelm Hauser becomes organist at the monastery of Lavaldieu and the teacher of Étienne Méhul.

Classical music 
Carl Friedrich Abel – 6 String Quartets, Op. 12
John Alcock Jr. – 8 Easy Organ Voluntaries
Carl Philipp Emanuel Bach 
Symphony in D major, H.663
Symphony in F major, H.665
Johann Christian Bach – Sinfonia concertante, W.C 34
Wilhelm Friedemann Bach – Keyboard Sonata in G major, F.7
Giovanni Battista Cirri – 6 String Quartets, Op. 13
Carl Ditters von Dittersdorf – Concerto for Oboe in D major
Tommaso Giordani – 6 Flute Trios, Op. 12
Joseph Haydn 
Baryton Trio in D major, Hob.XI:114
Il Ritorno di Tobia, Hob.XXI:1 (sacred oratorio)
Mass in B-flat major, Hob.XXII:7
Joseph Martin Kraus – Requiem
Georg Anton Kreusser – 6 Flute Quintets, Op. 10
Franz Lamotte – Violin Concerto No. 2
Wolfgang Amadeus Mozart 
Violin Concertos No. 3, No. 4 & No. 5
Symphony No.52 in C major, K.102/213c
Serenade in D major, K.204/213a
Church Sonata in B-flat major, K.212
Misericordias Domini, K.222/205a
Friedrich Wilhelm Rust – Sonata in A major, CzaR 110
Friedrich Schwindl – 6 Quartets, Op. 7
Maddalena Laura Sirmen – 6 Duets, Op. 5
Johann Matthias Sperger – Quartet in D major, for flute, viola, cello, and contrabass, M.C III:23a
Carl Stamitz – 3 Quintets, Op. 11
John Stanley – Six Concertos for the Organ, Harpsichord, or Forte Piano, with Accompanyments  for Two Violins and a Bass, Op. 10 (London: Printed for the Author, and Sold by Mr Welcker)

Opera 
Johann André – Erwin und Elmire
Pasquale Anfossi – L'Avaro
André Ernest Modeste Grétry – La fausse Magie
Joseph Haydn – L'incontro improvviso, Hob.XXVIII:6
Gaetano Latilla – Antigono
Wolfgang Amadeus Mozart
La finta giardiniera, K. 196 (premiered January 13)
Il re pastore, K. 208
Josef Mysliveček – Il Demofoonte (second version, first premiered in 1769)
Giovanni Paisiello 
Socrate immaginario, R.1.48
Il gran Cid, R.1.49

Methods and theory writings 

 Andrea Basili – Musica universale armonico pratica
 Marie-Dominique-Joseph Engramelle – La Tonotechnie
 Fedele Fenaroli – Regole musicali per i principianti di cembalo
 Johann Caspar Heck – Short and Fundamental Instructions for Learning Thorough Bass
 Jacob Schuback – Von der musikalischen Declamation

Births 
January 21 – Manuel del Pópulo Vicente García, singer and composer (d. 1832)
March 24 – Muthuswami Dikshitar, poet and composer (d. 1835)
May 1 – Sophia Dussek, composer and musician (died 1831)
June 4 – Francesco Molino, guitarist and composer (d. 1847)
June 13 – Antoni Radziwiłł, politician and musician (d. 1833)
July 5 – William Crotch, composer (d. 1847)
July 9 – Matthew Lewis, librettist and writer (died 1818)
August 2 – José Ángel Lamas, composer (d. 1814)
August 31 – François de Fossa, guitarist and composer (d. 1849)
September 17 – Margrethe Schall, ballerina (d. 1852)
October 6 – Johann Anton André, German composer (died 1842) 
October 15 – Bernhard Henrik Crusell, clarinettist and composer (d. 1838)
October 21 – Giuseppe Baini, composer and music critic (d. 1844)
October 30 – Catterino Cavos, organist, conductor and composer (d. 1840)
December 6 – Nicolo Isouard, Maltese composer (died 1818)
December 16 – François-Adrien Boïeldieu, composer (d. 1834)
December 25 – Antun Sorkočević, writer, composer and diplomat (d. 1841) 

date unknown
Joseph Antonio Emidy, violinist and composer (d. 1835)
Andrea Nozzari, operatic tenor (d. 1832) 
Giovanni Schmidt, Italian librettist (died c. 1839)

Deaths 
January 15 – Giovanni Battista Sammartini, organist and composer (b. c. 1700)
May 1–4? — Francesco Barsanti, composer; recorder & oboe virtuoso (b. 1690)
May 7 – Cornelius Heinrich Dretzel, organist and composer (b. 1697)
May 9 – Vittoria Tesi, operatic contralto (b. 1700)
June 11 – Egidio Duni, composer (b. 1708)
July 26 – Alessandro Besozzi, oboist and composer (b. 1702)
November 1 – Pierre-Joseph-Justin Bernard, librettist and writer (born 1708)
November 7 – François Rebel, composer (b. 1701)
December 9 – Pietro Gnocchi, composer (b. 1689)
date unknown – Rosa Scarlatti, opera singer (b. 1727) 

 
18th century in music
Music by year